Texas Masquerade is a 1944 American Western film directed by George Archainbaud, written by Jack Lait Jr. and Norman Houston, and starring William Boyd, Andy Clyde, Jimmy Rogers, Don Costello, Mady Correll and Francis McDonald. It was released on February 8, 1944, by United Artists.

Plot
Ace Maxson (Don Costello) and J. K. Trimble (Russell Simpson) are using night riders to scare ranchers off their land, for they know oil is under ground. Hoppy finds wounded lawyer James Corwin, (Nelson Leigh) and assumes his identify, but outlaw Sam Nolan (Francis McDonald) recognizes Hoppy.

Cast 
 William Boyd as Hopalong Cassidy
 Andy Clyde as California Carlson
 Jimmy Rogers as Jimmy Rogers
 Don Costello as Ace Maxson
 Mady Correll as Virginia Curtis
 Francis McDonald as Sam Nolan
 Russell Simpson as J.K. Trimble
 J. Farrell MacDonald as John Martindale
 Nelson Leigh as James Corwin
 Robert McKenzie as Marshal Rowbottom
 Pierce Lyden as Henchman Al
 June Pickerell as Mrs. Emma Martindale 
 Bill Hunter as Deputy Lou Sykes
 John Merton as Henchman Jeff

References

External links 
 
 
 
 

1944 films
American black-and-white films
Films directed by George Archainbaud
United Artists films
American Western (genre) films
1944 Western (genre) films
Hopalong Cassidy films
1940s English-language films
1940s American films